The women's long jump event  at the 1999 IAAF World Indoor Championships was held on March 6.

Results

References
Results

Long
Long jump at the World Athletics Indoor Championships
1999 in women's athletics